The 1999 Bausch & Lomb Championships doubles was the doubles event of the twentieth edition of the Bausch & Lomb Championships; a WTA Tier II tournament held in Amelia Island, Florida, United States, played on green clay. Sandra Cacic and Mary Pierce were the defending champions but lost in the quarterfinals to Lisa Raymond and Rennae Stubbs.

Conchita Martínez and Patricia Tarabini won in the final 7–5, 0–6, 6–4 against Raymond and Stubbs.

Seeds
The top four seeded teams received byes into the second round.

Draw

Final

Top half

Bottom half

External links 
 ITF tournament edition details

Amelia Island Championships
Bausch and Lomb Championships